Vaazhthugal is a 2008 Indian Tamil-language romantic drama film written and directed by Seeman, in his final directorial work before his entry into politics. The film stars Madhavan and Bhavana, along with Venkat Prabhu, Ilavarasu, Na. Muthuswamy and R. K., who play supporting roles. Produced by T. Siva for Amma Creations and with music scored by Yuvan Shankar Raja, Vaazhthugal was released on 14 January 2008 during Pongal.

Plot
Vazhthugal revolves around Kathiravan, a successful entrepreneur who manages a software company. Kathiravan is an affectionate son and socially responsible too. His company is involved in various social activities.

When his close friend's parents are forced by their daughter-in-law to leave home, Kathrivan decides to marry a girl who will keep his parents happy. While watching a television programme he is impressed by Kayal, a college student from Coimbatore being interviewed on a show.

To a question by the interviewer, 'where do you see yourself in another ten years?' Kayal deviating from the usual clichéd answers replies, "As an ideal wife, mother and daughter-in-law." And during the course of her talk, she attributes her success to her large and loving family consisting of her parents, maternal grandfather, aunts, uncles and cousins. Kathiravan is impressed with her attitude and feels that she is the right life companion for him.

He goes to Coimbatore to woo her. But meeting her in her college does not help. So he takes it as an opportunity when he learns that Kayal's grandfather is on the look out for an interior designer to renovate their traditional home. Posing as an interior designer, he undertakes the job winning the hearts of Kayal and her family members.

When the family learns that they are in love, especially Kayal's grandfather who believes that all love marriages are a failure. However, Kathiravan does not want to marry Kayal without her family's acceptance. So he tries to win their acceptance.

Cast

 Madhavan as T. Kadhiravan
 Bhavana as Kayalvizhi Thirunavukkarasu
 Venkat Prabhu as Kalai
 Ilavarasu as Thirunavukkarasu
 RK as Vetriselvan Selvanayagam
 Na. Muthuswamy as Selvanayagam
 Vijayalakshmi as Vennila
 T. Siva as Doctor
 T. Velmurugan
 Mallika Sukumaran
 Revathi Sankaran
 Trotsky Marudu

Production
Following the success of their previous collaboration in Thambi (2006), director Seeman and actor R. Madhavan decided to work on two more projects titled Magizhchi and Pagalavan by the end of 2006. After the launch in March 2007, Seeman announced that Magizhchi would narrate life's little sweet meanings and appeals in a poetic fashion, being a direct contrast to the pair's earlier film and Pagalavan, where Madhavan would play an angry vigilante. Bhavana Menon, who had worked alongside Madhavan in Arya (2007), was signed on to play the lead actress before the release of their other film together. The title Magizhchi had been registered so Seeman renamed the film as Vaazhthugal, and revealed that the film would feature no English word amongst its dialogues. Director Venkat Prabhu joined the film's cast, as did politician Velmurugan, industrialist RK and theatre actors Na. Muthuswamy and Trotsky Marudhu. Actor Naasar lent his voice for Na. Muthuswamy. The film was initially set to begin production in late 2007, but was preponed after Madhavan's other films Sarkar and Oru Naal Podhuma failed to materialise. The film was shot around Coimbatore, Pollachi and Udamalpet during late 2007.

Soundtrack

Music was composed by Yuvan Shankar Raja, who teamed up with director Seeman for the first time. The soundtrack, released on 3 January 2008, features 7 tracks, the lyrics were provided by Na. Muthukumar. The lyrics of the song "Muzhumai Nila" were taken from a poem, written by 'Purachi Kavignar' Bharathidasan.

Release
The film opened to negative reviews and performed poorly at the box office. Sify.com wrote "Seeman's intentions to make Vazhthukkal were noble but his execution is tacky and the final outcome is a dreary and boring message film that leaves you exhausted! The flaw is not in the tale, it's in the telling — too many songs, conversations going nowhere, clichéd characters and a long drawn out 30 minutes tedious climax". Behindwoods.com noted "Director Seeman seems to suggest that films are just a medium to express your opinions on society and its values. The result, the movie pans out into a medium of propaganda rather than a visually rich, soulful narrative. Though the intention is good, his attempt to have no English words in the dialogues seems too contrived. The first half of the story is wasted in an elaborate introduction of all the characters and the plot reaches a (so-called) stage of conflict only well into the second half." Rediff.com's critic wrote "Seeman has obviously tried desperately, and failed to make a movie with a moral message for today's generation." The film's failure and their strained relationship as writers on the sets of Evano Oruvan meant that the pair eventually opted not to make Pagalavan together.

References

External links
 

2008 films
Films set in Chennai
Films shot in Chennai
Films shot in Kerala
2000s Tamil-language films
Indian romantic drama films
Films scored by Yuvan Shankar Raja
Films directed by Seeman
2008 romantic drama films